James Kelly Cole (1885 – 1909) was a member of the Chicago Branch of the Industrial Workers of the World until his death in the fall of 1909. Cole was an active poet and prose writer whose work is of interest to IWW historians and critics of working class literature. Cole was killed in November 1909 when he apparently fell from a train between Chicago and Minneapolis en route to the Spokane free speech fight. Upon his untimely death, the IWW published a book of his writings to raise money for his aged parents. Little else is known of this poet-rebel except that he was convicted in 1907 of producing molds for counterfeit money.

Writings
Poems and Prose of James Kelly Cole, Industrial Workers of the World (1910)

Further reading
 Vincent St. John, "Remember James Kelly Cole," Industrial Worker, July 2, 1910.
 "Poet-Counterfeiter Guilty, Sentenced to 20 Months in Federal Prison". New York Times, October 26, 1907.

1909 deaths
Industrial Workers of the World members
1885 births